Nemapogon similella is a moth of the family Tineidae. It is found on Sardinia.

References

Moths described in 2007
Nemapogoninae